The Modern Jazz Quartet at Music Inn is a live album by American jazz group the Modern Jazz Quartet featuring performances recorded at the Music Inn in Lenox, Massachusetts in 1956, with guest artist Jimmy Giuffre appearing on three numbers, and released on the Atlantic label.

Reception
The Allmusic review stated "This is a worthwhile outing".

Track listing
All compositions by John Lewis except as indicated
 "Oh Bess, Oh Where's My Bess" (George Gershwin) - 4:27   
 "A Fugue for Music Inn" - 4:42   
 "Two Degrees East, Three Degrees West" - 7:04   
 "Serenade" (David Raksin) - 2:55   
 "Fun" (Jimmy Giuffre) - 5:30   
 "Sun Dance" - 4:14   
 "The Man That Got Away" (Harold Arlen, Ira Gershwin) - 3:32   
 "A Morning in Paris" - 2:51   
 "Variation No. 1 on "God Rest Ye Merry, Gentlemen" - 5:00   
Recorded at The Music Inn in Lenox, Massachusetts on August 28, 1956

Personnel
Milt Jackson - vibraphone
John Lewis - piano
Percy Heath - bass
Connie Kay - drums
Jimmy Giuffre - clarinet (tracks 2, 4 & 5)

References

Atlantic Records live albums
Modern Jazz Quartet live albums
1956 albums
Albums produced by Nesuhi Ertegun